Herman Adolph Flürscheim (August 1, 1851 – August 18, 1914) was a pioneer dry goods merchant and art collector. He was one of the first merchants to move to Fifth Avenue.

Biography
He was born in Frankfurt, Germany on August 1, 1851.

He came to the United States in 1875 or earlier. He had a brother, Michael Flürscheim. Herman worked for Stern Brothers until 1901 when he partnered with Franklin Simon in Franklin Simon & Co. Herman's children include: Harry D. Flurscheim; Estelle Flurscheim, who married Otto Loeb; Agnes E. Flurscheim, and Helen I. Flurscheim, who married Ansel Straus.

He died in Manhattan, New York City on August 18, 1914 and his estate was worth over $1M (approximately $ today).

References

1851 births
1914 deaths
19th-century American businesspeople